Phone (lit, "glory") is a Burmese name that may refer to:

Myint Tayzar Phone (born 1978), Burmese sprint canoer
Nay Phone Latt (born 1980), Burmese blogger and activist
Phone Maw Shwe, Burmese minister
Phone Thit Sar Min (born 1997), Burmese footballer 
Phone Zaw Han, Burmese city mayor 
Tekkatho Phone Naing (1930–2002), Burmese writer

Burmese names